Wilson Glacier is a glacier 9 nautical miles (17 km) long, flowing northeast into Edward VIII Ice Shelf just south of Seaton Glacier. Photographed from ANARE (Australian National Antarctic Research Expeditions) aircraft in 1956. Named by Antarctic Names Committee of Australia (ANCA) for Flight Lieutenant H.O. Wilson, RAAF pilot at Mawson Station, 1959, who was killed in an aircraft accident shortly after his return to Australia.

See also
 List of glaciers in the Antarctic
 Glaciology

References
 

Glaciers of Kemp Land